Rutford Ice Stream is a major Antarctic ice stream, about  long and over  wide, which drains southeastward between the Sentinel Range, Ellsworth Mountains and Fletcher Ice Rise into the southwest part of Ronne Ice Shelf. Named by US-ACAN for geologist Robert Hoxie Rutford, a member of several USARP expeditions to Antarctica; leader of the University of Minnesota Ellsworth Mountains Party, 1963-1964. Rutford served as Director of the Division of Polar Programs, National Science Foundation, 1975-1977.

The ice stream is situated in a deep trough which is a tectonic feature between the Ellsworth Mountains and the Fletcher Promontory. Because of this the ice stream position may have been stable for millions of years.

The speed of the Rutford ice stream varies by as much as 20% every two weeks, in response to variations in the tides.

Tributary glaciers
 Yamen Glacier
 Vicha Glacier
 Newcomer Glacier
 Vit Ice Piedmont
 Embree Glacier
 Young Glacier
 Ranuli Ice Piedmont
 Ellen Glacier
 Lardeya Ice Piedmont
 Guerrero Glacier
 Hough Glacier
 Remington Glacier
 Thomas Glacier
 Razboyna Glacier
 Drama Glacier
 Gabare Glacier
 Divdyadovo Glacier
 Minnesota Glacier
 Union Glacier

See also

 List of glaciers in the Antarctic
 List of Antarctic ice streams

Further reading
 Edward C. King, Flow dynamics of the Rutford Ice Stream ice-drainage basin, West Antarctica, from radar stratigraphy, Annals of Glaciology 50(51) 2009
 G.H. GUDMUNDSSON, A. JENKINS, Ice-flow velocities on Rutford Ice Stream, West Antarctica, are stable over decadal timescales, Journal of Glaciology, Vol. 55, No. 190, 2009, PP 339–344
 Edward C. King, Hamish D. Pritchard, and Andrew M. Smith, Subglacial landforms beneath Rutford Ice Stream, Antarctica: detailed bed topography from ice-penetrating radar, Earth Syst. Sci. Data, 8, 151–158, 2016, doi:10.5194/essd-8-151-2016, PP 151–158
 John WOODWARD, Edward C. King, Hamish D. Pritchard, and Andrew M. Smith, Radar surveys of the Rutford Ice Stream onset zone, West Antarctica: indications of flow (in)stability?, Annals of Glaciology 50(51) 2009, PP 57–62

References

West Antarctica
Ellsworth Mountains
Filchner-Ronne Ice Shelf
Ice streams of Queen Elizabeth Land